Eva or EVA may refer to:
 Eva (name), a feminine given name

Arts, entertainment, and media

Fictional characters
 Eva (Dynamite Entertainment), a comic book character
 Eva (Devil May Cry), in the Devil May Cry video game series
 Eva (Metal Gear), in the Metal Gear video games series
 Evangelion (mecha), in the Neon Genesis Evangelion franchise

Films
 Eva (1948 film), a Swedish film
 Eva (1953 film), a Greek drama film
 Eva (1958 film), an Austrian film
 Eva (1962 film), a French-Italian film in English 
 Eva (2010 film), an English-language Romanian film
 Eva (2011 film), a Spanish film
 Eva (2018 film), a French film

Music

Artists
Eva (singer), French singer
 E.V.A. (band) (Eve Versus Adam), an Italian female pop band
 Banda Eva, a Brazilian axé band

Musical works
 Eva (opera) (1899), by Josef Bohuslav Foerster
 "Eva" (Nightwish song), 2007
 "Eva" (Umberto Tozzi song), 1982
 "Eva", a song by Lisandro Cuxi
 "Eva", a song by Orgy on their album Vapor Transmission (2000)
 "E.V.A.", a song by Jean-Jacques Perrey from the album Moog Indigo (1970)
 "E.V.A.", a song by Public Service Broadcasting from the album The Race for Space (2015)
 "Eva", an album by Kadril (1999)

Other media
 Eva (Italian magazine), a women's magazine published between 1933 and 1968
 Eva (Norwegian magazine),  published from 2004 to 2009
 Eva (novel), a 1988 book by Peter Dickinson
 Neon Genesis Evangelion (franchise), an anime and manga series

Businesses and organizations
 EVA Air, a Taiwan-based airline and its designator
 Electric Vehicle Association of Great Britain, founded 1938
 English Volleyball Association, the former name of the controlling body for volleyball in England

Places

Greece
 Eva (Cynuria), a town of ancient Cynuria
 Eva, Arcadia

United States
 Eva, Alabama
 Eva, Florida
 Eva, Louisiana
 Eva, Oklahoma
 Eva, Tennessee
 Eva (archaeological site), near Eva, Tennessee
 Eva, West Virginia

Elsewhere 
Eva, Durango, Mexico
Eva, Samoa

Science and technology

Biology and healthcare
 Eva (apple), an apple variety
 EVA (benchmark), an evaluation of protein structure prediction
 Eva (moth), a moth genus
 Electric vacuum aspiration, a form of abortion
 Enlarged vestibular aqueduct, a deformity of the inner ear

Computing
 Electronic voice alert, a voice synthesizer for automobiles
 Enterprise Virtual Array, HP StorageWorks storage products
 Extended Vector Animation, a web-based graphic file format

Economics
 Earned Value Analysis, a measurement of project progress
 Economic value added, an estimate of a firm's profit

Other uses in science and technology

 EVA (howitzer), a Slovak self-propelled gun
 164 Eva, an asteroid
 Ethylene-vinyl acetate, a polymer used in athletic materials
 Extravehicular activity, work done by an astronaut outside of a spacecraft
 Extreme Value Analysis, a branch of statistics concerned with extreme value theory

Transport
 Eva (sternwheeler), an 1894 sternwheel steamboat
 Eva (transport), a proposed Spanish rail service

Other uses
 Eva (name), a feminine given name
 Eva (social network), a video social network
 EVA Conferences (Electronic Visualisation and the Arts)
 Storm Eva, a 2015 windstorm in northwestern Europe

See also
 EVAS (disambiguation)
 Eve (disambiguation)